Dibrugarh (pron: ˌdɪbru:ˈgɑ:) is an industrial city in Upper Assam with sprawling tea gardens. It is located 435 kms East from the state capital of Dispur. It serves as the headquarters of Dibrugarh district in the state of Assam in India. Dibrugarh serves as the headquarters of the Sonowal Kachari Autonomous Council, which is the governing council of the Sonowal Kachari tribe (found predominantly in the Dibrugarh district).

Etymology

Dibrugarh derived its name from Dibarumukh (as a renowned encampment of Ahoms during the Ahom-Chutia conflict). Either the name “Dibru” evolved from Dibaru river or from the Bodo-Kachari word “Dibru” which means a “blister” and “Garh” meaning "fort". The Bodo-Kacharis add the prefix “Di-” (which means “water”) wherever there is small stream, a river, or a large river in a town or city.

Climate
Dibrugarh has a humid subtropical climate (Köppen climate classification Cwa) with extremely wet summers and relatively dry winters.

Demographics

Males constituted 54% of the population and females 46%. The sex ratio of Dibrugarh city was 961 per 1000 males.

The average literacy rate of Dibrugarh is 89.5%, which is higher than the national average literacy rate.

In Dibrugarh, 9% of the population is between 0 and 6 years of age, and the child ratio of girls is 940 per 1000 boys. Dibrugarh city area has a population of 154,296 according to a 2011 census. The Dibrugarh metropolitan areas include Barbari (AMC AREA), Dibrugarh, and Mahpowalimara Gohain Gaon

Dibrugarh city have a population of 154,296 as per 2011 census. Assamese is spoken by 64,223 people, Bengali at 36,283, Hindi at 33,011, Bhojpuri by 5,533 people, Nepali at 1,609 and 11,911 people speaks other languages.

Economy

Oil India Ltd.

The first oil well dug during the British era was in Digboi,  from Dibrugarh. Today, Duliajan, Dikom, Tengakhat and Moran are the key locations for oil and gas industry in the district. Oil India Limited, the second public sector company in India engaged in exploration and transportation of crude oil has its field headquarters in Duliajan, 50 km from Dibrugarh city. The company was granted Navratna status by the Ministry of Petroleum and Natural Gas, in 2010

BCPL

The Assam Gas Cracker Project, also known as Brahmaputra Cracker and Polymer Limited, was proposed as a part of implementation of Assam Accord signed by Government of India on 15 August 1985.
The Assam Gas Cracker Project was approved by the Cabinet Committee on Economic Affairs, in its meeting held on 18 April 2006, under an equity arrangement of GAIL (70%), OIL (10%), NRL (10%) and Govt. of Assam (10%) with a project cost of ₹ 54.6 billion, in which the capital subsidy is ₹ 21.4 billion. The project was scheduled for completion in 60 months. However, the commissioning of the project has been pushed to December 2013, and the cost has escalated to ₹ 92.8 million. The site selected for Assam Gas Cracker Project is at Lepetkata, 15 km from Dibrugarh on NH-37. A joint-venture agreement was signed on 18 October 2006, and the company Brahmaputra Cracker and Polymer Limited was registered on 8 January 2007. Dr. Manmohan Singh, Hon'ble Prime Minister of India, laid the foundation stone of this project on 9 April 2007.

APL

Assam Petro-Chemicals is a semi-governmental Indian company with major stakes held by Government of Assam, Oil India Limited and Assam Industrial Development Corporation (AIDC). The company was incorporated in 1971 and by 1976 had started production at their small methanol plant located at Namrup along with formaldehyde and a few urea-formaldehyde resins like urea-formaldehyde glue and urea-formaldehyde moulding powder. Post expansion in 1989 and 1998, the company expanded the methanol plant to the capacity of 100TPD (tonnes per day) and formaldehyde plant to 100TPD. The company announced in September 2017 that it would invest  and expand to produce 500TPD methanol and 200TPD formalin and become the largest producer of methanol in India. The required feedstock for these plants are natural gas, urea and carbon dioxide. Natural gas, supplied by Oil India Ltd, is used as feedstock for methanol production. Urea and carbon dioxide are supplied by Namrup Fertilizer Plant.

Tea

Dibrugarh hosts several tea gardens dating back to the British era. Today, the headquarters of the Directorate of Development of Small Tea Growers in India is functioning from Dibrugarh, besides a Regional Office of the Tea Board of India headed by a deputy director of Tea Development (Plantation) is also located in the city. The Zone I of the Assam Branch Indian Tea Association(ABITA) is located at Dibrugarh.

Tourism

Rail, road and air connectivity coupled with the presence of large number of tourist spots in and around Dibrugarh city has seen impressive growth of tourism industry in this part of India in recent part. Dibrugarh has also become an important destination as well as a major transit point for tourists from both India and abroad. Such tourist circuits include – Dibrugarh – Roing – Mayudia – Anini Tourist Circuit, Dibrugarh – Guwahati river cruise besides 'Tea Tourism' for tourists who prefer serenity and novelty to the hustle-bustle of established tourist destinations

Transportation

Airways

Dibrugarh Airport, which is located around 15 km from Dibrugarh town at Mohanbari. Airlines operating from the airport are Air India, IndiGo, Vistara, SpiceJet and Pawan Hans. IndiGo connects Dibrugarh daily with Delhi via Kolkata and another non-stop to Delhi while in return via Guwahati. SpiceJet connects Dibrugarh daily with Guwahati and Kolkata. In 2013, Dibrugarh airport was provided with night landing facility. Commercial operation of aerobridges have also started in this airport.

Railways

Dibrugarh holds a prominent place in the history of Indian Railways with the first railway services of the entire North-East India starting from here. On 1 May 1882, the first train rolled down the tracks from Streamerghat at Dibrugarh. On 15 May 1882, it was extended up to Dinjan. On 23 December that year goods train up to Chabua was introduced. On 18 February 1884, at 7:20 am, the then Chief Commissioner of Assam Sir Charles Illiot flagged off the first passenger train from Reehabari rail station (now Dibrugarh Town Railway station) to Ledo with 400 European and Indian passengers. As per the Centenary Souvenir of the Assam Railways and Trading Company Limited published in 1991, the said company, being the pioneer in building Dibru–Sadiya Railway, described the entire history of railway development from Dibrugarh.
Dibrugarh Town and Dibrugarh are two railway stations of the city and also two of the important easternmost railway stations on the map of the Indian Railways connected to some of the important Indian cities like Bangalore, Chennai, Kochi, Trivandrum, Kolkata, Delhi, Kanyakumari etc. through the railways network. The new Dibrugarh railway station has been developed on the outskirts of the city at Banipur. It lies on the Lumding-Dibrugarh section of Tinsukia railway division. It is the biggest railway station in the entire north east spreading over 400 bighas of land and it is 2 km in length. One goods yard is also being developed for loading and unloading of goods along with a truck shed, which can accommodate 25 trucks at a time.

Waterways

Dibrugarh also possesses a developed waterway transportation system along and across the Brahmaputra river, known as the National Waterway 2 which extends from Bangladesh Border to Sadiya. Ferry services link Dibrugarh with Sengajan (Dhemaji District), Panbari (Dhemaji) & Oiram Ghat (near Jonai Dhemaji). From Bogibeel IWT Ghat there are regular ferry Services to Kareng Chapori & Sisi Mukh. Moreover, luxury cruise services are also available from Dibrugarh to Guwahati. The cruise to Dibrugarh passes through Tezpur and the Kaziranga National Park.

Education and research

Schools 

Dibrugarh Govt. Boys' Higher Secondary School, Milan Nagar (Estd. 1840)
Vivekananda Kendra Vidyalaya, Dibrugarh
Delhi Public School

Colleges 

 DHSK Commerce College
 Dibru College
 Dibrugarh Hanumanbax Surajmall Kanoi College
 Gyan Vigyan Academy
 Manohari Devi Kanoi Girls' College
 Salt Brook Academy
 D.H.S.K. Law College
 S.I.P.E. Law College
 Nandalal Borgohain City College
 Sri Sri Aniruddhadeva Junior College, Dibrugarh

University 

 Dibrugarh University
 Sri Sri Aniruddhadeva Sports University

Medical Institutions 

 Assam Medical College (founded by Dr. John Berry White in 1901 as Berry White Medical School and renamed Assam Medical College in 1947; it is the first medical college in Northeast India)
 Dibrugarh Dental College
 Regional Medical Research Centre, Dibrugarh

Technical Institutions 

 Dibrugarh Polytechnic

Media

Electronic media 

Dibrugarh has a full-fledged All India Radio centre, All India Radio, Dibrugarh broadcasting in both AM (567 kHz at 529.1 metres of MW) and FM (101.30 MHz) bands airing three transmissions a day along with a 5-minute regional news bulletin at 6:00 pm every day. All India Radio, Dibrugarh was commissioned way back on 15 February 1968. The station has its studios located at Malakhubosa in Dibrugarh and the high power transmission tower located at Lepetkata near the present Brahmaputra Cracker and Polymer Limited site. 

As for television viewing, the second Doordarshan centre of Assam, telecasting programmes in Assamese language, Doordarshan Kendra, Dibrugarh was established in the city in the year 1993. Earlier the Kendra used to telecast Assamese language programmes capsuled in Guwahati beginning 20 December 1991. The programmes produced in this Kendra are telecast through a high power transmitter. Dibrugarh Doordarshan Kendra is contributing programmes to the 'DD North East' channel.

Print media 
Dibrugarh has been a pioneer of newspaper journalism in entire Eastern India with the Times of Assam being the first newspaper published from Dibrugarh in the late nineteenth century. After four decades of publication, Times of Assam ceased to publish and from 1939 The Assam Tribune started its journey from Dibrugarh, which after 7 years of publication from Dibrugarh, shifted to Guwahati. However, this premier English daily of the North-East India, The Assam Tribune is published from Dibrugarh along with Guwahati and The Sentinel is published from Dibrugarh along with four other cities of North-East India. Several vernacular, as well English and Bengali dailies are published from Dibrugarh. Assamese newspapers published from Dibrugarh are Asomiya Pratidin, Janasadharan, Niyomiya Barta, Dainik Asam, Dainik Pratikshan and Pratibimba,.  Jugashangkha is a Bengali daily published from Dibrugarh along with Guwahati and Silchar.

Politics
Dibrugarh is part of Dibrugarh (Lok Sabha constituency). Rameswar Teli (BJP) is the current Member of Parliament from Dibrugarh. Former Chief Ministers of Assam, Sarbananda Sonowal & Jogendra Nath Hazarika hailed from Dibrugarh. BJP's Prasanta Phukan is the incumbent MLA of Dibrugarh (Vidhan Sabha constituency).

Notable people

 Jyoti Prasad Agarwala: Indian playwright, songwriter, poet, writer and film maker
 Paresh Baruah: leader of militant group, ULFA
 Parineeta Borthakur: Indian actress
 Kesab Chandra Gogoi: former chief minister of Assam
 Ranjan Gogoi: 46th Chief Justice of India
 Moloya Goswami: Indian actress
 Jogendra Nath Hazarika : former chief minister of Assam
 Shamin Mannan: Indian actress
 Biju Phukan: Assamese actor
 Nilmoni Phukan:  Assamese writer, poet, freedom fighter and politician.
 Nagen Saikia: Indian writer
 Dipannita Sharma: Indian actress and model
 Sarbananda Sonowal: former chief minister of Assam (2016–2021) & Union Cabinet minister of India (2021–2023)
 Prahlad Chandra Tasa: Indian writer and Educationist.
 Rameswar Teli: MP, Lok sabha from Dibrugarh.

See also

 Dibrugarh (Lok Sabha constituency)

References

External links
 
 Government website
 Dibrugarh University, Dibrugarh-786 004, Assam, India